Albert Halton VC (1 May 1893 – 24 July 1971) was an English recipient of the Victoria Cross, the highest and most prestigious award for gallantry in the face of the enemy that can be awarded to British and Commonwealth forces.

Details
Halton was born in Warton near Carnforth, Lancashire.  He was 24 years old, and a private in the 1st Battalion, the King's Own Royal Regiment (Lancaster), British Army during the First Battle of Passchendaele of First World War when the following deed took place for which he was awarded the VC.

On 12 October 1917 near Poelcapelle, Belgium, after the objective had been reached, Private Halton rushed forward about 300 yards under very heavy fire and captured a machine-gun and its crew which was causing heavy losses to our men. He then went out again and brought in 12 prisoners, showing the greatest disregard for his own safety and setting a fine example to those round him.

After the war Halton was an ironworker until his retirement in 1961, and during World War II he served in the Home Guard.

A commemorative plaque was installed in Sparrow Park, Warton, unveiled on 12 October 2017 by the Deputy Mayor of Lancaster.

The medal
His Victoria Cross is displayed at the King's Own Royal Regiment (Lancaster) Museum, in Lancaster, England.

References

External links

 
Monuments to Courage (David Harvey, 1999)
The Register of the Victoria Cross (This England, 1997)
VCs of the First World War - Passchendaele 1917 (Stephen Snelling, 1998)
Location of grave and VC medal (Lancashire)

1893 births
1971 deaths
People from Carnforth
King's Own Royal Regiment soldiers
British World War I recipients of the Victoria Cross
British Army personnel of World War I
British Home Guard soldiers
British Army recipients of the Victoria Cross
Military personnel from Lancashire